Acanthodiscus is an extinct ammonoid cephalopod genus from the order Ammonitida and included in the persphinctacean family Berriasellidae. The type species, named by Bruguière, 1792, is Acanthodiscus radiatus.

Description 
The lower (2/3) flanks bear strong, wide spaced, radial ribs with large nodes at either end, and become weaker on the mature body chamber. Outer flanks (approx. 1/3) slope toward a narrow, flat to concave venter lined on either side by a series of smaller nodes. the mature whorl section is higher than wide.

Biostratigraphic significance 
Acanthodiscus is found in shallow water sediments in both the Tethyan and Boreal realms where it is used as an index fossil. In fact, the International Commission on Stratigraphy (ICS) has assigned the First Appearance Datum of Acanthodiscus radiatus, the first species of the genus, as the defining biological marker for the start of the Hauterivian stage of the Cretaceous, ~132.9 million years ago.

Species 
 A. radiatus ; type species
 A. octagonus
 A. ottmeri
 A. rollieri
 A. schmidtii; Found on the Antarctic Peninsula
 A. subradiatus

Distribution 
Acanthodiscus fossils can be found in the Agrio Formation of the Neuquén Basin, Argentina. Also in the Macanal Formation of the Eastern Ranges of the Colombian Andes, fossils of Acanthodiscus have been found.

Other occurrences of the genus are in:
 Abundancia Formation, Chile
 Guchuochun Formation, China
 Kaliste Formation, the Czech Republic
 France
 Giumal Sandstone Formation, India
 Chia Gara Formation, Iraq
 Sardinia, Italy
 Sabinal Formation and Barril Viejo Shale Member, Mexico
 Myrtle Formation, Oregon, United States

References

Bibliography

External links 
 Acanthodiscus-Paleodb 
  Acanthodiscus radiatus in French
 T. Birkelund, et al.: Cretaceous Stage Boundaries - Proposals. Bulletin of the Geological Society of Denmark, vol. 33 1984 

Ammonitida genera
Prehistoric cephalopod genera
Index fossils
 
Ammonites of Asia
Cretaceous China
Fossils of China
Cretaceous India
Fossils of India
Fossils of Iraq
Ammonites of Europe
Fossils of the Czech Republic
Cretaceous France
Fossils of France
Cretaceous Italy
Fossils of Italy
Ammonites of North America
Cretaceous Mexico
Fossils of Mexico
Fossils of the United States
Ammonites of South America
Cretaceous Argentina
Fossils of Argentina
Cretaceous Chile
Fossils of Chile
Cretaceous Colombia
Fossils of Colombia
Extinct animals of Antarctica
Fossil taxa described in 1792
Fossil taxa described in 1905
Perisphinctoidea